The  is an electric multiple unit (EMU) train type operated by the private railway operator Sanyo Electric Railway in Japan since April 2016.

Design
The trains have aluminium alloy bodies.

Formations
, five three-car sets (6000 to 6004) are in service. The trains are formed as shown below, with two driving motor ("Mc") cars and one non-powered intermediate trailer ("T") car. Odd and even-numbered sets differ in that even-numbered sets have a gangway connection at the Sanyo Himeji (western) end, while odd-numbered sets have a gangway connection at the Nishidai (eastern) end.

Even-numbered sets

The intermediate trailer cars are fitted with two single-arm pantographs.

Odd-numbered sets

The intermediate trailer cars are fitted with two single-arm pantographs.

Interior
Passenger accommodation consists of longitudinal bench seating throughout. LED lighting is used.

History
Details of the new trains on order were first announced by Sanyo Electric Railway in May 2015.

The trains entered revenue service on 27 April 2016, with a departure ceremony held at Sanyo Himeji Station. Initially used only on the Sanyo Electric Railway Main Line, the trains also began operating on the Sanyo Electric Railway Aboshi Line from 17 May 2016.

References

External links

 Sanyo Electric Railway news release, May 2015 
 Kawasaki Heavy Industries news release, May 2015 

Electric multiple units of Japan
Train-related introductions in 2016
Kawasaki multiple units
1500 V DC multiple units of Japan